Physopsis spicata is a plant in the Lamiaceae family, first described in 1849 by Nikolai Turczaninow/

It is found in Western Australia.

References

External links
Physopsis spicata occurrence data from Australasian Virtual Herbarium

Flora of Western Australia
Plants described in 1849
Taxa named by Nikolai Turczaninow
Lamiaceae